BirGün (One Day) is an Istanbul-based Turkish left-wing daily.

The paper was founded in 2004 by a group of Turkish intellectuals. The most important point of the newspaper is that it is not owned by any parent company or conglomerate.

Since its foundation, the newspaper had to face serious pressures from publishing trusts, mainly to affiliated with Doğan Media Group that owns the vast majority of the market. Whereas most of the newspapers in Turkey pay paper and publishing cost as installments, BirGün had to pay in cash. In order to afford the costs, the newspaper first launched a subscription campaign, then raised its price to 0.75 TL. The price was 1 TL in 2012 and 1,5 TL in Summer 2015 while also costs 40 kuruş (0,4 TL) on universities in Turkey.

Most of the BirGün columnists are members or sympathizers of the socialist Freedom and Solidarity Party (ÖDP), which is a member of Party of the European Left and one of the founders of European Anti-Capitalist Left.

Columnists

 Ataol Behramoğlu
 Korkut Boratav
 
 Hrant Dink (assassinated on January 19, 2007)
 Süreyya Evren
 
 Zeynep Kuray
 Sabri Kuşkonmaz
 Oğuzhan Müftüoğlu
 Sırrı Süreyya Önder
 Ece Temelkuran

References

External links
 
BirGün Columnists

Newspapers published in Istanbul
Turkish-language newspapers
Newspapers established in 2004
Socialist newspapers
2004 establishments in Turkey
Daily newspapers published in Turkey